Asartodes zapateri is a species of snout moth in the genus Asartodes. It was described by Ragonot, in 1882, and is known from the Iberian Peninsula and France.

References

Moths described in 1882
Phycitini
Moths of Europe
Taxa named by Émile Louis Ragonot